Kevin Grimes may refer to:

 Kevin Grimes (ice hockey) (born 1979), Canadian ice hockey player
 Kevin Grimes (soccer) (born 1967), U.S. soccer defender